Josef Meinrad (21 April 1913 – 18 February 1996) was an Austrian actor. From 1959 until his death in 1996, Meinrad held the Republic of Austria's Iffland-Ring, which passes from actor to actor — each bequeathing the ring to the next holder, judging that actor to be the "most significant and most worthy actor of the German-speaking theatre"

Life
Josef Meinrad was born Josef Moučka in Vienna, as the fourth and youngest child of the tram driver Franz Moučka and his second wife Katharina. For his secondary education, he received a scholarship in a school run by Redemptorists in Katzelsdorf near Wiener Neustadt. At first, he wanted to become a priest, but he left the boarding school in 1929 and began a commercial apprenticeship, while taking acting lessons.

He made his public acting debut during a theatre festival at Korneuburg in 1930, by which time he called himself Josef Meinrad. Nevertheless, he finished his training and worked as a commercial clerk until 1935. From that time on, he performed on various smaller stages, passing his acting exam in 1937. His first brief engagement at the Vienna Burgtheater was in 1939, he then played at the German Theatre in Metz, mainly in front of Wehrmacht soldiers.

After the war, Meinrad again performed in Vienna. At the Salzburg Festival in 1947 he appeared in Jedermann. Later that year, Meinrad became a full-time permanent member of the Burgtheater company and was part of that ensemble until his 65th birthday in 1978. He played 195 roles on that stage and was famous for his performances in comedies by Johann Nestroy and Ferdinand Raimund. In 1968 he played the title role in the German-language premiere of Dale Wasserman's musical Man of La Mancha at the Theater an der Wien. He also appeared in several Films and TV series, chiefly known for his role as an adjutant in the Sissi trilogy starring Romy Schneider.

Meinrad was the keeper of the Iffland-Ring, which for 200 years has been given to the most important actor of the German-speaking theatre; he passed the ring on to Bruno Ganz.

From 1950 until his death he was married to Germaine Renée Clement, who died in 2006. Meinrad died in 1996 from cancer, aged 82, in Großgmain and is buried there.

Honours and awards
 1955: Appointed Kammerschauspieler
 1959: Received the Iffland-Ring
 1961: Blue Ribbon Award from the National Council Screen
 1963: Kainz Medal
 1963: Austrian Cross of Honour for Science and Art, 1st class
 1973: Honorary Member of the Vienna Burgtheater
 1980: Honorary Ring of the city of Bregenz
 1983: Raymund Ring of the Federal Ministry for Education, Arts and Culture
 1983: Honorary Ring of the Vienna
 1985: Nestroy Ring
 1997: Josef Meinrad-Platz near the Vienna Burgtheater

Films 

  (1947) as Agha
 Triumph der Liebe (1947) as Kinesias
 The Trial (1948, about the Tiszaeszlár affair) as Bary, investigating judge
 Rendezvous im Salzkammergut (1948) as Peter Baumkirchner
 Anni (1948) as Heinrich Buchgraber
 Fregola (1948) as Dr. Wegscheider
 Das Siegel Gottes (1949) as Father Clemens
 Nothing But Coincidence (1949) as Willy Wendel
 Mein Freund, der nicht nein sagen konnte (1949) as Dr. Leopold Bachmann
 Bonus on Death (1950) as Seaman Matrose
 Theodore the Goalkeeper (1950) as Theo Haslinger Jr.
  (1950) as Dr. Mario Jaconis
 Archduke Johann's Great Love (1950) as A friend of Archduke Johann
 Der Wallnerbub (1950) as Karl
 Love and Blood (1951) as Otto Schulz
 Shadows Over Naples (1951) as Otto Schulz
 Eva erbt das Paradies... ein Abenteuer im Salzkammergut (1951) as Hans Holzinger
 The Colourful Dream (1952) as Tobby Busch
 1. April 2000 (1952) as Prime Minister of Austria
  (1953) as Rolf Reimann
 The Spendthrift (1953) as Valentin
 Money from the Air (1954) as Stefan Gregor
 Kaisermanöver (1954) as Wondrasch
 Walking Back into the Past (1954) as Franz Nägele
 Die Deutschmeister (1955) as Hofrat Hofwirt
 Don Juan (1955) as Leporello
 His Daughter is Called Peter (1955) as Dr. Felix Weininger
 Sarajevo (1955) as Chauffeur
 The Congress Dances (1955) as Franzl Eder
 Sissi (1955) as Major Böckl
 Ein tolles Hotel (1956) as Edi Schlawinsky
 Opera Ball (1956) as Paul Hollinger
 Die Trapp-Familie (1956, cf. The Sound of Music) as Dr. Franz Wasner
 Sissi – Die junge Kaiserin (1956) as Major Böckl
 August, der Halbstarke (1957) as August Rums, genannt Gustl, Boxer
 The Schimeck Family (1957) as Baumann
 Die unentschuldigte Stunde (1957) as Fabian
 Goodbye, Franziska (1957) as Dr. Leitner
 Sissi – Schicksalsjahre einer Kaiserin (1957) as Lieutenant Colonel Böckl
 Man ist nur zweimal jung (1958)
 Solang' die Sterne glüh'n (1958) as Karl Eibisch
 The Trapp Family in America (1958) as Dr. Franz Wasner
  (1959) as Ferdinand Windberger - Legationsrat
 Eva (1959) as Mr. Dassau
  (1959) as Baron Hager
 Adorable Arabella (1959) as Archibald Duncan
 Napoleon II, the Eagle (1961) as Emperor Francis II
 Der Bauer als Millionär (1961) as Fortunatus Wurzel
 Liliom (1963, TV movie based on Liliom) as Liliom
 The Cardinal (1963) as Cardinal Innitzer
 The Spendthrift (1964) as Valentin
 Don Quixote (1965, TV miniseries based on Don Quixote) as Don Quixote
 Father Brown (1966–1972, TV series) as Father Brown
  (1967, TV Mini-Series) as Gaston
 Was ihr wollt (1973, TV movie based on Twelfth Night) as Malvolio
  (1974) as Magician Petrosilius Zwackelmann
 Die schöne Helena (1974, TV movie based on La belle Hélène) as Menelaus
 Gaslicht (1977, TV movie based on Gaslight) as Jack Manningham
 Es war einmal der Mensch (1978, TV Series) as Narrator (German version, voice)
 Ringstraßenpalais (1983, TV Series) as Emil Hoffeneder
 Waldheimat (1984, TV Series) as Pfarrer
 Die Fledermaus (1984, TV movie based on Die Fledermaus) as Frosch
 Der Sonne entgegen (1985, TV Series) as Luca
 Der Unbestechliche (1986, TV movie) as Theodor
 Der Vorhang fällt (1986, TV movie) as Jakob
 Herschel und die Musik der Sterne (1986, TV movie) as Joseph Haydn

He appeared twice in the German TV series, Der Kommissar.

External links

1913 births
1996 deaths
Austrian male stage actors
Austrian male voice actors
Iffland-Ring
Austrian people of Czech descent
Male actors from Vienna
Recipients of the Austrian Cross of Honour for Science and Art, 1st class
Austrian male film actors
Austrian male television actors
20th-century Austrian male actors
Deaths from cancer in Austria